Togoro Kotia  is a commune of the Cercle of Ténenkou in the Mopti Region of Mali. The principal village lies at Sossobé. The commune contains 13 villages and in 2009 had a population of 13,687.

The commune lies in the Inner Niger Delta and each year between July and December the area is flooded. During this period most villages can only be accessed by boat.

References

Communes of Mopti Region